Adriaan Gerritsz de Vrije (c.1570, Gouda – 1643, Gouda), was a Dutch Golden Age glass painter.

Biography

According to the RKD he was probably related to the glass painter Dirk de Vrije. He was a pupil of Wouter and Dirk Crabeth.
In 1595 he took out a loan to buy "glass manufacturing materials" and became the first curator of the stained glass windows of the Janskerk, Gouda. In service of the States of Holland, he made the window "Glass 1" after a design by Joachim Wtewael and the window "Glass 29" after his own design. In Glass 1 he also designed all of the city heraldic shields that border the main subject.

References

1570s births
1643 deaths
Dutch Golden Age painters
Dutch male painters
People from Gouda, South Holland